The Princess of Carignano was a woman married to the Prince of Carignano of the House of Savoy. The list ends with Charles Albert, in 1831, after he became King of Sardinia.  But the Queens of Sardinia and later Italy used the title "Princess of Carignano" as part of their full title which included a lot of other titles.

The fief of Carignano had belonged to the counts of Savoy since 1418; Carignano was erected by Charles Emmanuel I, Duke of Savoy into a principality as an appanage for his third son, Thomas Francis. The fact that it was part of Piedmont, only twenty km. south of Turin, meant that it could be a "princedom" for Thomas in name only, being endowed neither with independence nor revenues of substance. Instead of receiving a significant patrimony, Thomas was wed in 1625 to Marie de Bourbon, sister and co-heiress of Louis de Bourbon, comte de Soissons, who would be killed in 1641 while fomenting rebellion against Cardinal Richelieu.

Princess of Carignano

de facto

de jure

As noted, the Principality was bought by Louis Jean Marie de Bourbon; as such the title was born by his Modenese wife; at his death to passed to his daughter by inheritance. The title was confiscated off Marie Adélaïde during the French Revolution.

See also
List of Savoyard consorts
List of Sardinian consorts
List of Italian consorts

References

Sources

See also

Lists of princesses
Princesses of Carignan
1625 establishments in Italy